L'Esperance or L'Espérance (French for "The Hope"), may refer to:

L'Espérance (newspaper), Guinean newspaper
L'Esperance, U.S. Virgin Islands, settlement
L'Espérance (ship), a French privateer ship captured in the action of 30 September 1780
L'Esperance Rock, an islet in the South Pacific Ocean

People
David Ovide L'Espérance  (1864–1941), Canadian politician
Elise L'Esperance (1878–1958), American physician
Renée L'Espérance, Jamaican model

See also
Espérance (disambiguation)
Lesperance